"The Man Who Sold the World" is a song by English singer-songwriter David Bowie. The title track of Bowie's third studio album, it was released in November 1970 in the US and in April 1971 in the UK by Mercury Records. Produced by Tony Visconti, it was recorded at Trident and Advision Studios in London in May 1970, towards the end of the album's sessions; Bowie recorded his vocal on the final day of mixing for the album, reflecting his generally dismissive attitude during the sessions. Musically, it is based around a "circular" guitar riff from Mick Ronson. Its lyrics are cryptic and evocative, being inspired by numerous poems including the 1899 "Antigonish" by William Hughes Mearns. Bowie's vocals are heavily "phased" throughout and have been described as "haunting".

"The Man Who Sold the World" went relatively unnoticed upon initial release in 1970. It was not released as a single by Bowie, though appeared as a B-side on the 1973 reissues of "Space Oddity" in the US and "Life on Mars?" in the UK by RCA Records. It was not until it was covered by Scottish singer Lulu, whose 1974 recording, produced by Bowie and Ronson, peaked at No. 3 on the UK Singles Chart, that the song gained mainstream attention. In subsequent decades, the song has been covered by Scottish musician Midge Ure in 1982, and the American rock band Nirvana in 1993, whose performance of the song for the television programme MTV Unplugged introduced it to a new audience. 

Retrospectively, Bowie's original recording has been named one of his best songs, with reviewers praising its haunting and unsettling atmosphere. Bowie performed the track live later in his career in different renditions than the original, including in a darker style during 1995's Outside Tour; a studio recording of the tour's arrangement appeared as a B-side of "Strangers When We Meet" in 1995. He again rerecorded the song in an acoustic arrangement in 1996 for the documentary ChangesNowBowie; this version was released in 2020 on the digital version of the EP Is It Any Wonder? and on the album ChangesNowBowie. The original recording has appeared on multiple compilation albums and has been remastered multiple times, including in 2015 as part of the box set Five Years (1969–1973).

Composition and recording
The backing track for "The Man Who Sold the World" was recorded at Trident Studios in London on 4 May 1970, along with other album track "Running Gun Blues". At this point, the track was recorded under the working title "Saviour Machine" and did not contain the title phrase. According to Kevin Cann, the lineup featured Bowie on acoustic guitar, Mick Ronson on electric guitar, producer Tony Visconti on bass, Woody Woodmansey on drums and percussion, and Ralph Mace on Moog synthesiser; Ronson and Woodmansey would later become famous as a part of the Spiders from Mars. According to Visconti, Bowie recorded his vocal on 22 May at Advision Studios, the final day of mixing for the album which, when traveling to Advision, Bowie had intended to name Metrobolist, a homage to Fritz Lang's 1927 film Metropolis. Chris O'Leary writes that Bowie wrote the lyrics in the reception area of the studio while Visconti waited at the mixing console. Once he finished, he quickly recorded his vocal, Visconti added a "flange" effect and mixed the track in a few hours, sending the tapes to the label later that night. Bowie's last-minute addition frustrated Visconti, who recalled in 1977: "This was the beginning of [Bowie's] new style of writing – 'I can't be bothered until I have to'. When it was finished, on the last day of the last mix, I remember telling David, 'I've had it, I can't work like this anymore – I'm through...David was very disappointed." This frustration was mostly due in part to his dissatisfaction with the recording sessions: he was mostly in charge of budget and production, as well as maintaining Bowie's interest in the project. Bowie later told BBC Radio 1's Stuart Grundy in 1976: "It was a nightmare, that album. I hated the actual process of making it."

Bowie's original recording is described by author Peter Doggett as "enigmatic", while Nicholas Pegg describes it as giving an "unassuming air of pathos and menace". Doggett notes that the track contains none of the "metallic theatrics" that are found on the rest of the album. Musically, the song opens with a repeating electric guitar riff from Ronson with an acoustic guitar from Bowie underneath it. (The electric bass and Moog synthesiser notwithstanding) O'Leary writes that apart from Ronson's electric guitar, the song is primarily acoustic.  The chord structure is in the key of F with an A major chord "borrowed" from the D minor scale, similar to fellow album track "All the Madmen". Throughout the song, Visconti's bass "runs scales" under the chorus and a melody "elsewhere", Woodmansey plays "ecstatic" drum fills deep in the mix and Latin-style percussion "trembling" on the surface; Ronson uses feedback to introduce the chorus. Bowie's vocals are "heavily phased" during the verses and briefly doubled (which, in Bowie's words, "came as some surprise"), compressed and again double-tracked during the chorus. Douglas Wolk of Rolling Stone similarly calls Bowie's vocals and lyrics "haunting". Pegg describes the guiro percussion as "sinister", the guitar riff "circular" and Bowie's vocal "ghostly". The tracks ends with a coda, described by Doggett as a "haunting chorale" and by O'Leary as "ominous"; it contains wordless vocals and is primarily in D minor.

Title and lyrics

According to Doggett, the song's title has multiple "precursors": including a 1949 Robert A. Heinlein science fiction novella "The Man Who Sold the Moon"; a 1954 DC comic, "The Man Who Sold the Earth"; a 1968 Brazilian political satire, The Man Who Bought the World. However, none have a thematic link to Bowie's song. Pegg suggests that the title partly reflects an element of "self-disgust" Bowie has over the thought of "losing control" and "selling" his private life via profoundly personal music.

The lyrics are noted as very cryptic and evocative; in Doggett's words, "begging but defying interpretation." Like most of his work during this period, Bowie frequently avoided giving a direct interpretation of the lyrics; he later remarked that he felt it was unfair to give it to Lulu in 1973 because it dealt with the "devils and angels" within himself (she later confessed she "had no idea what it meant"). Bowie once stated that the song was a sequel to "Space Oddity" which, in Doggett's words, is "an explanation designed to distract rather than enlighten", quoting the lyrics "Who knows? Not me". The song's narrator has an encounter with a kind of doppelgänger, as suggested in the second chorus where "I never lost control" is replaced with "We never lost control". Beyond this, the episode is unexplained: as James E. Perone wrote,

In common with a number of tracks on the album, the song's themes have been compared to the horror-fantasy works of H. P. Lovecraft. The lyrics are also cited as reflecting Bowie's concerns with family problems and splintered or multiple personalities and are believed to have been partially inspired by the poem "Antigonish" by William Hughes Mearns: "As I was going up the stair / I met a man who wasn't there / He wasn't there again today / I wish, I wish he'd stay away..." By claiming he "wasn't there", Bowie "compounds" the identity crisis while believing his companion "died alone, a long, long time ago." Pegg writes that the "defacement of the individual" and "dread of mortality" provide "grim counterparts" to the "immortal anguish" of fellow album track "The Supermen" and the meditations on "impermanence" and "rebirth" in "After All".

Release and reception
"The Man Who Sold the World" was released as the eighth and penultimate track on Bowie's third studio album of the same name in November 1970 in the US and in April 1971 in the UK by Mercury Records. Although no singles were issued from the album, the song appeared as the B-side on the 1973 reissue US single release of "Space Oddity" and UK single release of "Life on Mars?", both by RCA Records.

Retrospectively, Bowie's original recording has been named one of his best songs, with many praising the haunting and unsettling nature of the recording. Following Bowie's death in 2016, Rolling Stone listed the song as one of his 30 essential songs. The same year, Ultimate Classic Rock, in their list of Bowie's ten best songs, listed "The Man Who Sold the World" at number 10, calling it "one of his most haunting songs of all time". They subsequently commended Lulu and Nirvana's cover versions for helping bring the song into the mainstream. In 2018, NME, in their list of Bowie's 40 greatest songs, ranked "The Man Who Sold the World" number 17, writing, "[The track] is not just a vintage slice of Bowie story-telling but a key part in his '90s renaissance, 20 years later", due in part to Nirvana's cover, which appeared at a time when "Bowie's critical stock was at a career-low... coming after Bowie's late-'80s run of maligned albums." In 2020, Alexis Petridis of The Guardian ranked the song 23rd in a list of Bowie's 50 greatest songs, writing, "The title track of his eeriest album remains mysterious, creepy and haunting 50 years on."

Legacy
Bowie's original recording of "The Man Who Sold the World" has been released on multiple compilation albums, including The Best of David Bowie 1969/1974 (1997), Best of Bowie (2002), Nothing Has Changed (2014) and Legacy (2016). The song, along with its parent album, has been remastered multiple times, including in 2015 as part of the box set Five Years (1969–1973). Bowie performed the song on numerous occasions. He recorded the song for the American television programme Saturday Night Live in December 1979, with Klaus Nomi and Joey Arias. Pegg calls this version "superb". He performed the song during his summer 2000 tour, including at the BBC Radio Theatre in London and at the Glastonbury Festival. Performances from these venues have been released on Bowie at the Beeb (2000) and Glastonbury 2000 (2018), respectively. A performance from the Reality Tour is featured on the live album A Reality Tour (2010).

The song has been covered by hundreds of artists. Many have noted that certain covers have managed to outshine the popularity of Bowie's original recording. The most popular covers include Scottish singer Lulu, whose version produced a UK top ten hit in 1974 and was produced by Bowie and Ronson, Scottish musician Midge Ure in 1982, whose cover of the song was featured in the 2015 video game Metal Gear Solid V: The Phantom Pain, and the American rock band Nirvana, whose 1993 performance of the song for the television program MTV Unplugged introduced it to a new audience. Speaking about Lulu's recording, Bowie recalled in 2002, "I still have a very soft spot for [Lulu's] version, though to have the same song covered by both Lulu and Nirvana still bemuses me to this day." AllMusic's Dave Thompson argues that the Lulu, Midge Ure and Nirvana recordings have managed to "establish the song at the very forefront of Bowie's canon." Pegg writes that the popularity of its covers have made listeners unaware that the song was written by Bowie. However, Alexis Petridis of The Guardian argues that although subsequent covers have tended to outshine Bowie's original in terms of popularity, none have ever matched the quality of the original.

Bowie re-recorded "The Man Who Sold the World" on multiple occasions. For performances on the Outside Tour, it was performed in what Pegg calls a "radical trip-hop revamp"; a studio recording of the song was recorded by Bowie and mixed by Brian Eno and appears as the B-side of the CD single "Strangers When We Meet" (1995) and on digital and physical versions of the EP Is It Any Wonder? (2020). Following mixing in late October 1995, Eno wrote in his diary, "It sounds completely contemporary. I added some backing vocals and a sonar blip and sculpted the piece a little so that there was more contour to it." Live versions of this version of the song from 1995 were released in 2020 as part of the concert albums Ouvre le Chien (Live Dallas 95) and No Trendy Réchauffé (Live Birmingham 95). In 2020, on what would have been Bowie's 73rd birthday, a previously unreleased acoustic version, recorded for the ChangesNowBowie documentary in 1996 during the Earthling sessions, was released. According to Jon Blistein of Rolling Stone, this version has "a lighter touch, with that famous serpentine guitar riff slinking around a steady acoustic strum and slowly swelling synths." It features Gail Ann Dorsey on bass and vocals, Reeves Gabrels (whom Bowie collaborated with in the band Tin Machine) on guitar, and Mark Plati on keyboards and programming. This version was released on the digital version of the EP Is It Any Wonder? in February 2020 and on the album ChangesNowBowie in August 2020. Stephen Thomas Erlewine, writing for Pitchfork, described the re-recording as "a nod to Nirvana popularising the song a few years earlier". A live version recorded in 1997 during Bowie's Earthling Tour was released in 2021 on the live album Look at the Moon!

Personnel
According to Kevin Cann:
David Bowie – lead vocals, acoustic guitar
Mick Ronson – electric guitar
Tony Visconti – bass guitar
Woody Woodmansey – drums, percussion
Ralph Mace – Moog synthesiser

Certifications

Lulu version

The song was covered by the Scottish singer Lulu in 1974, who, according to biographer David Buckley, performed it in "a sleazy, almost Berlin cabaret style". O'Leary categorises her rendition as "glam-disco" and calls it "loud, captivating and distorting." Lulu would recall Bowie inviting her to a concert he gave after which he met her in his hotel room saying: "I want to make a MF of a record with you [because] you're a great singer." Lulu – "I didn't think it would happen but [Bowie] followed up two days later. He was übercool at the time and I just wanted to be led by him. I loved everything he did. I didn't think 'The Man Who Sold the World' was the greatest song for my voice, but it was such a strong song in itself. I had no idea what it was about. In the studio Bowie kept telling me to smoke more cigarettes, to give my voice a certain quality."

Regarding meeting her in the "Last Supper" at the Hotel Café Royal, Bowie later said, "We started talking about the possibility of working together. I was keen to get something fixed up, because I really have always thought that Lulu has incredible potential as a rock singer. I didn't think this potential had been fully realised...we decided on 'The Man Who Sold The World' as being most suitable." Bowie produced Lulu's recording of "The Man Who Sold the World" with Mick Ronson during the July 1973 Pin Ups sessions at the Château d'Hérouville in Hérouville, France and also contributed saxophone and backing vocals. The remainder of the band included Ronson on guitar, Trevor Bolder on bass, Mike Garson on piano, and Aynsley Dunbar on drums. Bowie added saxophone overdubs and oversaw the final mix at Olympic Studios in London during the Diamond Dogs sessions. According to O'Leary, Bowie had Lulu smoke cigarettes in between takes in order to "abrade" her voice.

Lulu's version of "The Man Who Sold the World" was released as a single on 11 January 1974 by Polydor Records (as 2001 490), with a cover Bowie's Aladdin Sane track "Watch That Man" as the B-side. She promoted her version with an appearance on the British television programme Top of the Pops on 10 January, in which she performed in a charcoal suit and gangster hat. According to Pegg, this outfit bore a "remarkable resemblance" to the wardrobe of Bowie's future persona the Thin White Duke. Neil Bartlett characterised her performances as "dressed and sounding exactly like a diminutive Bowie". Her performances helped the single peak at No. 3 on the UK Singles Chart, as well as No. 8 on the Irish Singles Chart, and No. 24 and 10 on the Belgian and Netherlands Singles Charts, respectively. O'Leary writes that the single charted higher than almost all of Bowie's 1970s singles and made his original recording "seem like a demo". Jack Whatley of Far Out magazine writes that while Nirvana's cover is "the stuff of legend", it is Lulu's version of the song that "has us spellbound from its first sleazy moments." He argues that she has the "perfect voice" for the track and calls the video a "seventies dream." He further calls her first Top of the Pops performance "stunning, arresting, and a silky smooth affair, filled with enough sleaze to make your weekend feel naughty it remains the best version of Bowie’s iconic song."

Track listing
All songs written by David Bowie.

 "The Man Who Sold the World" – 3:58
 "Watch That Man" – 5:11

Chart positions

Personnel
According to Roy Carr and Charles Shaar Murray:
Lulu – lead vocals
David Bowie – saxophone, backing vocals
Mick Ronson – guitars
Trevor Bolder – bass guitar
Mike Garson – piano
Aynsley Dunbar – drums

Nirvana version

Recording
In his journals, Kurt Cobain of the American grunge band Nirvana ranked the album The Man Who Sold the World at number 45 in his top 50 favourite albums. Cobain and bassist Krist Novoselic were introduced to The Man Who Sold the World by one of their drummers Chad Channing, who bought a used LP version and converted it to cassette. Cobain found great interest in the title track and was surprised to learn it was by Bowie. Nirvana subsequently recorded a live rendition of the song during their MTV Unplugged appearance at Sony Music Studios in New York City on 18 November 1993 and included it on their MTV Unplugged in New York album the following year. The song was also released as a promotional single for the album in 1995. O'Leary notes that rather than play acoustic versions of their more popular songs, such as "Smells Like Teen Spirit", the band instead opted for relatively obscure cover versions, including "The Man Who Sold the World", which at the time, was considered a Bowie outtake by MTV standards.

For their performance, Cobain ran his acoustic guitar through a fuzz box that he could trigger with a pedal, allowing the guitar to sound electric. Nirvana's cover received considerable airplay on alternative rock radio stations and was also placed into heavy rotation on MTV, peaking at number 3 on MTV's most played videos on 18 February 1995; it also peaked for two weeks at number 7 on Canada's MuchMusic Countdown in March 1995. Nirvana regularly covered the song during live sets after their MTV Unplugged performance up until Cobain's death in 1994. Following Cobain's death, O'Leary states that the group's performance of "The Man Who Sold the World" became Cobain's "ghost song". In 2002, the song was re-released on Nirvana's self-titled "best of" compilation. Douglas Wolk of Pitchfork argues that the song "didn't really become a standard" until Nirvana covered it.

Reception

Brian Kay of Classic Rock History called their performance of the song "haunting" and "mesmerising". He writes, "Cobain's haunting vocals overtook and descended the Bowie lyric into an arena of darkness and hallucination that seemed to be Bowie's original intent. [The presence of the Meat Puppets' Cris and Curt Kirkwood], along with Cobain's lyrical phrasing and gritty yet humbling resonance, left the audience spellbound." Stephen Thomas Erlewine of AllMusic, in his review of MTV Unplugged in New York, wrote: "No other band could have offered covers of David Bowie's "The Man Who Sold the World" and the folk standard "Where Did You Sleep Last Night" on the same record, turning in chilling performances of both – performances that reveal as much as their original songs."

Bowie said of Nirvana's cover: "I was simply blown away when I found that Kurt Cobain liked my work, and have always wanted to talk to him about his reasons for covering 'The Man Who Sold the World and that "it was a good straight forward rendition and sounded somehow very honest. It would have been nice to have worked with him, but just talking with him would have been real cool." Bowie called Nirvana's cover "heartfelt", noting that "until this [cover], it hadn't occurred to me that I was part of America's musical landscape. I always felt my weight in Europe, but not [in the US]." In the wake of its release, Bowie bemoaned the fact that when he performed the number himself, he would encounter "kids that come up afterwards and say, 'It's cool you're doing a Nirvana song.' And I think, 'Fuck you, you little tosser! Rolling Stone added: "If the mark of a good cover is that people do not even realise it's a cover, Nirvana certainly did a good job" and that "The song also took on new meaning after Cobain died. This was a man with the world at his finger tips, and he gave it all up". The magazine ranked Nirvana's version number one in a reader's poll of the greatest live cover songs.

Legacy and other versions

At a pre–Grammy Awards party on 14 February 2016, surviving Nirvana band members Krist Novoselic, Dave Grohl, and Pat Smear teamed up with contemporary Beck to perform "The Man Who Sold the World" in tribute to Bowie–who had died the month before—with Beck performing vocals. To mark what would have been Kurt Cobain's 50th birthday, in 2017 the Phonographic Performance Limited released a list of the twenty most-played Nirvana songs on TV and radio in the UK; "The Man Who Sold the World" ranked at number six.

In 2013, an electric guitar version appeared on Nirvana's Live and Loud video album, which was also released digitally and on vinyl in 2019. Later the same year, a rehearsal performance for their MTV Unplugged set was released on the 25th anniversary digital and vinyl editions of the album, and had only previously been available on the DVD version that was released in 2007. On 4 January 2020, the surviving members of Nirvana again teamed up with Beck on vocals and St. Vincent on guitar to perform the song at a charity event for The Art of Elysium's annual Heaven gala.

Track listings

US and European promo CD
"The Man Who Sold the World" (LP version) – 3:48

Italian jukebox 7" promo split with Aerosmith (limited to 500 copies)
"The Man Who Sold the World" (Performed by Nirvana)
"Walk on Water" (Performed by Aerosmith)

Charts

Weekly charts

Year-end charts

Certifications

Accolades

Personnel
Kurt Cobain – vocals, lead guitar
Pat Smear – rhythm guitar
Krist Novoselic – bass guitar
Dave Grohl – drums
Lori Goldston – cello

References

Sources

External links

1970 songs
1974 singles
David Bowie songs
Lulu (singer) songs
Nirvana (band) songs
Songs written by David Bowie
Song recordings produced by Tony Visconti